Fabrizio Schembri (born 27 January 1981) is an Italian athlete competing in the triple jump and occasionally in the long jump.

Biography
Fabrizio Schembri won four medals, at senior level, at the International athletics competitions. He began his racing career in the ranks Athletics Rovellasca with the high jump, and soon became a promise in the specialty. But it is in the triple jump where he finds true fulfillment that leads to professionalism and the Gruppo Sportivo Carabinieri. Raised in Rovellasca, now resides in nearby Cascina Nuova.

Achievements

National titles
He has won 9 times the individual national championship.
Italian Athletics Championships
Long jump: 2012
Triple jump: 2009, 2013, 2014, 2018
Italian Athletics Indoor Championships
Triple jump: 2011, 2014, 2015, 2016

See also
 Italian all-time top lists - Triple jump

References

External links
 

1981 births
Living people
Athletics competitors of Centro Sportivo Carabinieri
Italian male long jumpers
Italian male triple jumpers
Sportspeople from the Province of Varese
Athletes (track and field) at the 2016 Summer Olympics
Olympic athletes of Italy
World Athletics Championships athletes for Italy
Mediterranean Games gold medalists for Italy
Mediterranean Games bronze medalists for Italy
Mediterranean Games medalists in athletics
Athletes (track and field) at the 2009 Mediterranean Games
Athletes (track and field) at the 2013 Mediterranean Games